In English folklore, grindylow or grundylow is a creature in the counties of Yorkshire and Lancashire. The name is thought to be connected to Grendel, a name or term used in Beowulf and in many Old English charters where it is seen in connection with meres, bogs and lakes.

Grindylows are supernatural creatures that appear in the folklore of England, most notably the Lancaster area. They are described as diminutive humanoids with scaly skin, a greenish complexion, sharp claws and teeth, and long, wiry arms with lengthy fingers at the end. They dwell in ponds and marshes waiting for unsuspecting children, which they grab them with their shockingly strong grip and drag them under the surface of the waters. Grindylows have been used as shadowy figures to frighten children away from pools, marshes or ponds where they could drown.

Peg Powler, Nelly Longarms, and Jenny Greenteeth are similar water spirits.

In popular culture
 Grindylows appear in the Harry Potter books and films where they live in the lake near Hogwarts. They first appear in the novels Harry Potter and the Prisoner of Azkaban and Harry Potter and the Goblet of Fire by J. K. Rowling. They are described as sickly green creatures with sharp little horns, green teeth, and long spindly fingers.
 A hostile race called grindylows appears in The Scar, a novel by China Miéville. They are described as humanoid with grey-green mottled skin, large dark eyes, foot-long teeth and a single eel-like tail below the waist.
 Evil aquatic monsters called grindylows appear in the Pathfinder Roleplaying Game.
 A grindylow is in the Jane Yellowrock series by Faith Hunter as well as the companion series called Soulwood. While they are still ravaging creatures of death, a young grindylow is cute like a green kitten and can be quite loyal to those who know it.

See also
Borda (legendary creature)
Nelly Longarms
Vodyanoy

References 

English legendary creatures
Northumbrian folklore
Water spirits